XHCOV-FM is a radio station on 105.9 FM in Poza Rica, Veracruz. It is owned by Radiorama and is known as Éxtasis Digital.

History
XECOV-AM 790 received its concession on April 5, 1994. It broadcast with 1,000 watts day and 500 at night and was owned by Radiorama concessionaire Radio Social, S.A.

XECOV was authorized to move to FM in November 2010.

In February 2021, the Éxtasis Digital format moved from XHPR-FM 102.7 as a result of the announced sale of XHPR-FM and XHPW-FM to Marcos López Zamora, the owner of XHRIC-FM 101.9.

References

Radio stations in Veracruz